Xerocrassa ripacurcica is a species of air-breathing land snail, a pulmonate gastropod mollusk in the family Geomitridae. 

Subspecies
 Xerocrassa ripacurcica montsicciana (Bofill, 1890)
 Xerocrassa ripacurcica oreina (Fagot, 1888)
 Xerocrassa ripacurcica ripacurcica (Bofill, 1886)

Distribution

This species is native to France and Spain.

References

 Bofill, A. (1886). Contributions à la faune malacologique de la Catalogne. Bulletins de la Société Malacologique de France. 3: 151-164. Paris.
 Fagot, P. (1887-1888). Contribuciones á la fauna malacológica de Aragón. Catálogo razonado de los Moluscos del valle del Éssera. Crónica Científica, 10 (236): 345-347 (10 September 1887); 10 (242): 481-484 (10 December 1887); 11 (245): 31-39 (25 February 1888); 11 (248): 103-108 (10 March 1888); 11 (249): 127-131 (25 March 1888); 11 (252): 193-198 (10 May 1888). Barcelona
 Bank, R. A.; Neubert, E. (2017). Checklist of the land and freshwater Gastropoda of Europe. Last update: July 16th, 2017.

ripacurcica
Molluscs of Europe
Gastropods described in 1886